Sekolah Menengah Sains Tapah (abbreviated SESTA) is a Malaysian government boarding school (Sekolah Berasrama Penuh/SBP) located in the town of Tapah, Perak. It occupies an area of 30 acre land, four kilometers from the town. It began its operation on 12 April 2010.

Location 
SESTA is located 4 kilometer (3 miles) from Tapah main town, along the Federal Route 59 (Tapah-Cameron Highlands road) and just opposite to the 4 Malay Regiment (4RAMD) army camp and beside the new Batang Padang District Education Office (PPD). It is mainly accessible from the town via the FT1-FT59 junction, from Cameron Highlands 50 km down west, and also 2 km eastward from Tapah exit of North-South Highway (E1) towards the same route.

History

Planning and Construction 
Construction started on 12 October 2006 and was scheduled to complete on 11 November 2008, but completion was delayed to 29 August 2009. Zulkarnain Zainal Abidin was appointed as the caretaker of the school in March 2009, but his appointment were delayed until June due to the slow school construction progress. The total cost of construction was RM38,482,000.00.

Opening 
The school was opened on 23 October 2009 by Hajjah Norlia Mohd Shuhaili, Deputy Director of the Residential and Excellence School Department. On 1 February 2010 Hadi Mat Dain was appointed as the first principal of the school. By March 2010, 35 teachers had been hired. The school's first intake of students started on 16 April 2010. Owing to lack of complete infrastructure at the time, the Upper Form intake began the following year.

Early years 
By February 2012 it has completed enrolling students from Form 1 until 5. The SPM batch of 2012 is also the first batch that graduated from this school.

In 2013, Perak Education Department has chosen the school as the venue of the state's SPM result announcement. The school placed second behind MCKK in overall state results, with more than 30 students get all A's. The state Education Department remarked this achievement outstanding for a new school. The PMR candidates of 2012 also recorded outstanding results as more than 50 students getting all A's in their results, placing third in state overall results.

However, in October that year SESTA made it through the headline again, due to the school being in the series of food poisoning. Around 200 students sent to the district clinic and some are detained in hospital. This also affects the students which are taking PMR on the fateful day.

Upgrading to a Cluster School 
The outstanding performance in SPM examination continues with Class 2013 (Partisan) achieved similar results like 2012. The overall results for their Bahasa Melayu paper is really great, with a GPS of 0.12. Due to this achievement and subsequent achievement in co-curricular activities, the Education Ministry has granted SESTA with the title of Sekolah Kluster Kecemerlangan (SKK) in 2014.

The Innovation teams won awards from local and international tournaments, as far as Europe. So does the Adikestari traditional dancing team. The most remarkable is SESTA placed first in their SPM 2014 results in Perak, with a record of more than 40 students getting all A's. This follows a good start for their PT3 candidates which, despite low results nationwide, recording 29 students getting all A's. This is considered much of a surprise since even much of the boarding school don't have such high achievements.

In 2015, SESTA for the first time handles 2 big events in a year. First is SBP National Japanese Language Cultural Day (Hari Kebudayaan Bahasa Jepun, HKBJ) which is a Japanese cultural event for SBP students. Second is Coaching of Coaches (COC), a training for SBP hostel leaders about daily hostel management and event management.

High Performance School 
SESTA has been declared as High Performance School (Sekolah Berprestasi Tinggi, SBT) from the Education Ministry in April 2016, one of the youngest school that has been offered of such title. A declaration event is done in SESTA with all former principal attended the event.

Earlier in February SESTA takes part in Sorak Semangat Le Tour de Langkawi 2016, a cheering event for schools which location is involved in Le Tour de Langkawi routes. Due to their overwhelming efforts and spirits shown, they won the grand prize.

However, in March the same year, SESTA once again involved in a mass food poisoning cases, which source is from lace pancake (roti jala) which were prepared unhygienically. Tens of students became victims, with several of them were warded in Tapah Hospital for some while. This made a headline into the national medias.

SESTA once again make a record as the most performing school in SPM History subject in SPM 2016.

Inauguration 
After around 10 years, SESTA has been inaugurated by the Sultan of Perak, Sultan Nazrin Muizzuddin Shah on 18 October 2019 in a grand ceremony held at Dewan Seri Bitara (formerly and famously known as Dewan SESTA), in conjunction with his birthday celebration. Perak nobles and leaders, particularly the Raja Permaisuri Tuanku Zara, both Raja Muda and Raja Dihilir also attended the ceremony with their respective spouses, alongside the then Menteri Besar, Ahmad Faizal.

Campus overview and developments 
SESTA is a semi-closed campus, with movements control differ per group. Students only allowed to go out during outing or overnight homecoming, and their relatives can only visit during weekend on certain visiting hours. Teachers and their relatives that live here has an all-time access out and in of the campus, others are required to register their entry beforehand. However public can access the school particularly during Friday prayer as the musolla are registered as Surau Diri Jumaat (lit: Friday-enabled Musolla, a certain status that allow them to handle Muslim's Friday Prayer) and occasionally during some open events from the school or other parties held here

The campus has a main hall, an administrative block, a pair of academic blocks and four special activity blocks. All the blocks are easily accessible with covered pathways. There are also three blocks of quarters where some of the teachers reside there, alongside 4 unit of terrace quarters for the main administrators. Hostel complex are consisted of two main hostel buildings for male and female students, a musolla building and a dining hall.

The school has a mini stadium and 4 sport fields that caters on multiple sports with different needs like football, takraw, volleyball and basketball, with other sports can also uses those field as they fit. Another field, which is said to be a rugby exclusive field is included but later shelved due to cost reducement practice by government, which saw the area planned for the field remains as a small palm oil plantation area until present time. The plans, has since not revived citing the lack of funds needed.

The campus has plagued with issues since its opening, which is caused by original low quality development brought by the constructors, causing incidents like broken floors which accumulates dust, flying roofs which damages some other facilities and endanger the inhabitants and also many other issues. While the issue is very frequent, the lack of funds always cited by the administrators when asked on the solutions.

The school has seen a lot of facility developments and renovations over the years, which solves some raised issues related to facilities. The main hall was renovated gradually, beginning with air conditioner additions, adding of tiles, replacement of doors and some permanent decorations. The musolla originally can only fit half of the students, but a renovation taking place in 2016 added an extension to the prayer halls, allowing more people to pray inside it especially during Friday prayers which is open to public.

References 

Educational institutions established in 2010
2010 establishments in Malaysia
Co-educational boarding schools